The Fairy is a 2011 French-Belgian comedy film written and directed by Dominique Abel, Fiona Gordon and Bruno Romy. It won several prizes at the 2nd Magritte Awards.

Cast
 Dominique Abel as Dom
 Fiona Gordon as Fiona, la fée
 Philippe Martz as John, l'Anglais
 Bruno Romy as Le patron de l'Amour Flou
 Vladimir Zongo as Le premier clandestin
 Destiné M'Bikula Mayemba as Le deuxième clandestin
 Willson Goma as Le troisième clandestin
 Didier Armbruster as L'homme volant
 Anaïs Lemarchand as La chanteuse
 Lenny Martz as Jimmy

References

External links
 
 

2011 films
2010s French-language films
2011 comedy films
Belgian comedy films
French comedy films
French-language Belgian films
2010s French films